Santa Rosa, officially the Municipality of Santa Rosa (Tagalog: Bayan ng Santa Rosa) is a 1st class municipality in the province of Nueva Ecija, Philippines. According to the 2020 census, it has a population of 75,649 people.

Santa Rosa is bounded by Cabanatuan to the north, Laur to the east, General Tinio to the south-east, Peñaranda and San Leonardo to the South, Jaen to the south-west, and Zaragoza to the west. The Pampanga River traverses near the center of the municipality.

History

Santa Rosa, according to the National Historical Commission of the Philippines, was founded as a municipality on August 1, 1878, through a Spanish decree. In his letter dated March 9, 2017, NHCP OIC-Chairman Rene Escalante said the Spanish decree was retrieved from the Archivo Historico Nacional in Madrid, Spain and is entitled "Creacion de un pueblo civil formado por al barrio de Santa Rosa en la provincia de Nueva Ecija".

In his book, "Nueva Ecija: 1896-1946", Cesar Baroman wrote that Santa Rosa was a mere "bisita" of Cabanatuan before while Cabanatuan was a "barrio" of Gapan.

During the American occupation, the Philippine Commission enacted Act. Number 933 ("An Act reducing the 23 municipalities of the province of Nueva Ecija to fifteen") on October 8, 1903, which merged Santa Rosa with Cabanatuan.

In 1907, Act Number 1687 ("An Act to increase the number of municipalities in the province of Nueva Ecija from 14 to 15, by separating from Cabanatuan the former municipality of Santa Rosa, reconstituting the latter as a municipality, and giving to each the territory it comprised prior to the passage of Act 933") was enacted by the Philippine Commission which separated Santa Rosa from Cabanatuan.  According to Act #1687, the Municipal President would receive P400 per year while the Municipal Treasurer would get a salary of P300/year.

Geography

Barangays
Santa Rosa is politically subdivided into 33 barangays.

The Punong Barangay heads the Barangay Government and he/she is assisted by the Barangay Kagawads (Councilors). There is also a Barangay Secretary, Barangay Treasurer, Hepe ng Tanod (Chief), Barangay Tanods, Barangay Health Workers, Day Care Worker in every barangay.  In 2018, SK Chairpersons and SK Kagawads were elected.  The SK Chairperson became a member of the Sangguniang Barangay.

Originally, Santa Rosa had 3 barangays or barrios during the Spanish period:  Soledad, La Fuente and Rajal. In 1903, the number of barrios became 4 with the addition of Poblacion.  Later on, the number of barrios increased to 17, namely, Cojuangco, La Fuente, Liwayway, Malacanang, Maliolio, Mapalad, Rizal, Rajal Centro, Rajal Norte, Rajal Sur, San Gregorio, San Mariano, San Pedro, Santo Rosario, Soledad, Valenzuela and Zamora.

During the term of Mayor Juanito Bernardo (1988–1998), the 17 barangays became 33 barangays.  Some barangays such as San Gregorio, San Mariano, La Fuente, Santo Rosario and San Pedro were subdivided.  San Gregorio, for example, was divided into 5 barangays (Aguinaldo, Burgos, Mabini, Tramo and San Gregorio ); San Mariano became 4 barangays (Del Pilar, Gomez, Luna and San Mariano);  La Fuente became 3 barangays (La Fuente, San Josep and Sapsap);  Santo Rosario became two barangays (Inspector and Santo Rosario) and San Pedro became two barangays (San Isidro and San Pedro).

Elected as Punong Barangays last May 14, 2018 were the following:  Aguinaldo - Florencio Damian;  Berang - Ariel Maningas;  Burgos - Rodolfo Mesina; Cojuangco - Federico Ribultan; Del Pilar - Marcial Rommel Marcelo; Gomez - Arsenio Bernandino; Inspector - Emiliano Muncal; Isla - Wilfredo Galang; La fuente - Rene Sebastian;  Liwayway - Renz Santos;  Lourdes - Ramil Sumera; Luna - Alexander Santos; Mabini - Jonathan Ruiz; Malacanang - Pepito Benitez Jr.;  Maliolio - Maria Dolores Relucio; Mapalad - Severino Mababa; Rajal Centro - Alex Encarnacion; Rajal Norte - Juanito Santiago;  Rajal Sur - Reynaldo Perpetua; Rizal - Gil de Leon;  San Gregorio - Mario dela Cruz;  San isidro - Hervin Cabrera;  San Josep - Cecilio Manabat;  San Mariano - Enrique Longalong;  San Pedro - Norberto Mangalinao;  Santa Teresita - Loida Evangelista;  Santo Rosario - Alfredo Sardual;  Sapsap - Victor Sarabia;  Soledad - Marilou Angeles-De Leon;  Tagpos - Carmelito dela Cruz;  Tramo - Petronilo Germino;  Valenzuela  - Nicanor Santos;  Zamora - Antonio Venturina

Elected as SK Chairpersons last May 14, 2018 were the following: Aguinaldo - Wilmer Dosdos;  Berang - Cherry Laygo;  Burgos - Vincent Alejo; Cojuangco - Christian Angeles; Del Pilar - Aerol Odra;  Gomez - Arvin Sanqui;  Inspector - Jhon Patrick Lacanlalay;   Isla - Ivann Casino;  La Fuente - Glen Harvey Yap;  Lourdes - Dinky Paolo Ranola;  Luna - Von Khristian Verdillo;  Mabini - Heidi Rose Batalla;  Malacanang - Charlie Joy Bala;  Maliolio - Analyn Enriquez;  Mapalad - Angel Narcisus Reyes;  Rajal Centro - Ralph Laurence Legaspi;  Rajal Norte  -  John Kennedy Martin;  Rajal Sur - Ralph Raymond Pablo;  Rizal - Kenneth Putungan;  San Gregorio - Dominique de Guzman;  San Isidro - Isabell Eunice Gutierrez;  San Josep - Sofia Nina Santos;  San Mariano - Romeo Ladignon;  San Pedro - Randell de Guzman;  Santa Teresita - Carlo Emil Domingo;  Santo Rosario - Jhon Arthur Lazaro;  Sapsap  - Cherry Alyson Pascual;  Soledad - Kimverlyn Pangan;  Tagpos - Jhon Kits Reyes;  Tramo - Vera Lian Gabriel;  Valenzuela - Kim Zymon Gonzales;  Zamora - Mar Sixto Catahan

Climate

Demographics

Economy 

Santa Rosa primarily depends on rice cultivation, vegetable production, commercial fishery, and tricycle sidecar fabrication. Just recently, the town started realizing its development potential.

The town's strategic location at the crossroads of two national highways: the Maharlika Highway and the Tarlac-Santa Rosa-Fort Magsaysay Road is accelerating its commercial and industrial development. It is also inevitably set to benefit from the spillover of Cabanatuan's built-up area.

As a result, Santa Rosa is gradually replacing agriculture with services and agro-industry as the main engines for growth. The stretch of Maharlika Highway is a growing commercial strip of local entrepreneurs competing with national businesses while the eastern part of the town is attracting investments in large commercial farms.

As of 2017,based on Commission on Audit of the Philippines,Santa Rosa economic status reached their Income of P190,671,476.98;Assets of P470,150,569.41;Liabilities of P181,022,725.17 and Allotments of 294,983,551.31.

Concurrent to Santa Rosa's rapid growth is the buildup of perennially heavy traffic at the approach to the intersection of the national roads. To address the worsening situation, the local government teamed up with the Cabanatuan city government to construct a road that will bypass the town proper. As for Santa Rosa, only further growth is anticipated when Central Luzon Link Expressway and North Luzon East Expressway finally materialize.

Government

Pursuant to the Local government in the Philippines, the political seat of the municipal government is located at the Municipal Town Hall. In the History of the Philippines (1521–1898), the Gobernadorcillo was the Chief Executive who holds office in the Presidencia. In 1895, the Spaniards changed the position of Gobernadorcillo to Capitan Municipal.  (Local Government in the Philippines, Jose P. Laurel) During the American rule (1898–1946) (History of the Philippines (1898–1946)), the elected Mayor and local officials, including the appointed ones, held office at the Municipal Town Hall.

Under the Local Government Code of 1991 or Republic Act No. 7160, the Mayor acts as the Local Chief Executive and the different departments (Budget, Engineering, Treasury, Accounting, etc.) are under the supervision of the Mayor.  The Vice Mayor, on the other hand, is the Presiding Officer of the Sangguniang Bayan/Sangguniang Panlungsod which enacts ordinances or issues Resolutions. The LGC of 1991, primarily authored by former Senator Aquilino "Nene" Pimentel Jr., gave local autonomy to local government units (LGUs) at the provincial, city/municipal and barangay level.  The LGUs were provided with Internal Revenue Allotment (IRA) that gave them a substantial amount of public funds aside from the locally generated funds (real property tax, fees, charges).  Functions/services formerly provided by national government agencies such as the Dept. of Agriculture, Dept. of Health, Dept. of Social Welfare and Development were devolved to the provincial and city/municipal LGUs.

The incumbent Mayor of Santa Rosa is Josefino M. Angeles while the current Vice Mayor is Marie C. Evangelista (2019 - 2022).  The incumbent Municipal Councilors are Romeo Angeles, Irene Bernardo, Dennis Dimacali, Roberto Jacinto, Armando Manuel, Marjorie Matias,  Julian Mendoza and Glenn Santos.  ABC President Rommel Marcelo and SK Fed. President Vera Liane Gabriel are also members of the Sanggunang Bayan.

2016 - 2019
The major projects of the Municipal Government under Mayor Marita Angeles, Vice Mayor Boyet Angeles and the Sangguniang Bayan are the following: Distribution of health kits to pregnant women and mothers with a baby under the Alagang Ina, Alagang Marita Project;  Construction of new Public Market; Construction of new Sangguniang Bayan building;   Construction of commercial stalls beside the Santa Rosa Central Elementary School;   Installation of street lights at the Santa Rosa bridge and barangays Cojuangco, La Fuente, Rizal, Soledad;   Rehabilitation/Repair of Municipal Gym;   Construction of Comprehensive Drainage System covering 13 barangays at the town proper and Construction of an Infirmary Hospital with the assistance of the Department of Health and 3rd District Representative Ria Vergara.

The LGU of Santa Rosa was an awardee of the Seal of Good Housekeeping (SGH) in 2011 and Seal of Good Local Governance (SGLG) in 2017, 2018 and 2019.  These two awards are given by the Department of the Interior and Local Government to local government units which practice good governance, transparency and accountability.

The previous Mayors of Santa Rosa were the following: Eulalio Saulo, 1909–1911; Dionisio Punsal, 1911–1913; Rafael Andres, 1917–1919; Apolinario Manubay, 1919–1921; Amado del Barrio, 1923–1928; Matias Beley, 1929–1931; Casimiro Marcelo, 1932–1939; Lazaro Cajucom, 1941–1944; Jacinto Martin, 1945–1947; Bonifacio Santos, 1948–1951; Severino Angeles, 1952–1959 / 1964–1971; Pedro Manubay, 1960–1963; Cesar Angeles, 1972–1985; Eduardo Enrile, 1985–1986; Juanito Bernardo, 1988–1998; Edgar Matias, July 1998 – December 1998; Geronimo Baldazo, December 1998 – 2001; Marlon Marcelo, 2001–2007; Josefino Manucot Angeles, 2007–2016; Marita Chua Angeles 2016 - 2019.

The following served as Vice Mayors of Santa Rosa:  Benito Germino, 1952-59 / 1964–71;  Marciano Marcelo, 1969–79; Eduardo Ennrile, 1972–1985; Rufino Galman, 1985–1988; Sesinando Santos, 1988–1992;  Edgar Matias, 1992–1998;  Gerry Baldazo, 1998;  Julian "Jojo" Mendoza, 1998–2001;  Josefino "Otep" Angeles, 2001–2007;  Irene Bernardo, 2007–2013;  Antonio Romero, 2013–2016; Eliseo Angeles, 2016–2019.

Tourism

Santa Rosa's main landmark includes Santa Rosa Supermarket or "Pamilihang Bayan ng Santa Rosa", Santa Rosa Town Hall, Santa Rosa Town Park, Santa Rosa Central School, and St. Rose of Lima Parish Church. Other attractions which are most visited by tourists are The famous and old, round-shaped, miraculous chapel of San Mariano known as "The Miraculous Round Chapel of San Mariano", 18th Century Ancestral Houses in Santa Rosa, a private "Gazebo" of Cruz Compound in San Mariano, 1890 Ancestral House of Brgy. San Gregorio, American Air Base and rivers, Mga Munting Bahay-kubo, and scenic rice fields.

St. Rose of Lima Parish Church

The 1879 St. Rose Of Lima Parish Church belongs to the Roman Catholic Diocese of Cabanatuan (Dioecesis of Cabanatuanensi, Suffragan of Lingayen-Dagupan, comprising 16 towns of Southern Nueva Ecija, Cabanatuan, Palayan City and Gapan; Titular: St. Nicholas of Tolentine, September 10; Most Reverend Sofronio A. Bancud, SSS, DD).

The Church is located at Maharlika Hway, Poblacion, Santa Rosa, 3101 Nueva Ecija. It is part of the Vicariate of St. Rose of Lima (Titular: St. Rose of Lima, Feast, Aug 23). Its current Parish Priest is Rev. Fr. Edwin C. Dizon.

St. Rose of Lima, T.O.S.D., (April 20, 1586 – August 24, 1617) was the first person born in the Americas to be canonized by the Catholic Church.

1946 Holy Cross College and Chapel
The Holy Cross College (Former Holy Cross Academy) was founded by Rt. Rev. Msgr. Fernando C. Lansangan, Parish priest of the town of Santa Rosa in 1985 as a secondary school with two first year classes. In 1948, government recognition was granted to the school for its high school department. In 1981, the expansion of the school's curricular program was conceived.  During SY 1982–1983, the MECS granted permit for the first and second year curriculum of the degree Bachelor of Arts and the first and second year curriculum for the Junior Secretarial Course were offered to the public In its 39th year of service to the community.

Dr. Raquel Tioseco Santa Ines, niece of the founder Priest took over the management of the college after his death.  In all its 66 years of existence, HCC continues with additional TESDA programs in Restaurant Management, Computer Secretarial, and Electronic and Computer Technology; and six-month courses in Contact Call Center and Medical Transcription. HCC offers Masters in Education major in Mathematics and English.

San Mariano Chapel or "The Miraculous Round Chapel of San Mariano"

San Mariano Chapel is a round-shaped chapel located at the core of Barangay San Mariano Santa Rosa, Nueva Ecija. This serves as a landmark of the said Barangay. It was named after the patron saint of the barrio, "San Mariano". The land where it is located was privately owned by a devoted family. After total and complete renovation of the said chapel, the land title was donated to St. Rose of Lima Parish Church.

The Old Miraculous San Mariano Chapel was then reconstructed with the help of a devotee named Antonio M. Romero year 2000 after he recovered from paralysis in 1989. The said devotee religiously attended the mass held at San Mariano Chapel then miraculously recovered from such an illness as stated. He, later on, served as the Vice Mayor of the town and lost in his re-election due to black propaganda.
People of San Mariano in the early 1900s used to kneel when passing by the old church including their carabaos or "kalabaw" before farming at dawn as a sign of respect in the said chapel.

The chapel was believed to be miraculous and famous as it was known to be visited by thousands of devotees of "The Blessed Virgin Mary"  and "Santo Niño" during the 1960s and 1970s. Miracles were actually witnessed by the people who visited the chapel and attended the mass held by the parish priest at that time. Evidence of such miracles were collected and kept by groups of families and people.

The Feast of Santo Niño was celebrated in San Mariano Chapel every 25 February wherein a mass was held and simple gift-giving and feeding for the children were organized by certain groups.

1890 Ancestral House of Brgy. San Gregorio, Santa Rosa

An ancestral house built in 1890, this is a landmark known in the whole town of Santa Rosa. Its renovation was initiated in 1974 and finished in 1977. A house strongly founded out of tons of cement and copper steel. It comprises 4 balconies, 3 living room areas, 3 kitchens, 5 common bedrooms, and a master bedroom. The living room area had its traditional atmosphere through the marble design floors. During the Spanish era, the chandeliers illuminated the whole house. The majority of its wooden surface was made out of pure narra. The great descendants of Capt. Gregorio drl Barrio (founder of San Gregorio) had meaningful experiences full of love which are worth reminiscing up to the present generation. The house symbolizes a Filipino's resilience for it stood for more than a hundred years overcoming raging calamities like typhoons and earthquakes.

Education
Santa Rosa, Nueva Ecija is served by both public and DepEd-accredited private/catholic schools. 
Holy Cross College, a catholic school and has been a legacy of the late Rt. Rev. Fr. Fernando C. Lansangan. Msgr. Lansangan was parish priest of St. Rose of Lima Parish and great and vulnerable founder of this prestigious learning institution. This school has always been the waving color of this town, in terms of turning out successful graduates far and wide the country as a whole. http://hcc.netne.net
Jesus Is Lord Christian School
Malacanang National High School
Saint Rose of Lima Catholic School
Santa Rosa Central School
Sta Rosa National High School
Rose of Sharon Christian School
Santo Rosario National High School
Saint Christopher Montessori School of Santa Rosa

Gallery

Sister cities
 Cabanatuan, Nueva Ecija
 Gapan, Nueva Ecija
 Aliaga, Nueva Ecija
 Santa Rosa City, Laguna

References

External links

 [ Philippine Standard Geographic Code]
Philippine Census Information
Local Governance Performance Management System

Municipalities of Nueva Ecija
Populated places on the Pampanga River